Quetta Cantonment is a military cantonment area adjacent to the city of Quetta in the Balochistan province of Pakistan.

See also
 Khuzdar Cantonment
 Loralai Cantonment
 Ormara Cantonment
 Zhob Cantonment

References

Populated places in Quetta District
Cantonments of Pakistan
Military in Balochistan, Pakistan
Military installations in Balochistan, Pakistan
Pakistan Army airbases